Biglia is a surname. Notable people with the surname include:

 Andrea Biglia (1395–1435), Italian Augustinian humanist
 Francesco Biglia (1587–1659), Italian Roman Catholic bishop
 Giovanni Battista Biglia (1570–1617), Italian Roman Catholic bishop
 Lucas Biglia (born 1986), Argentine footballer
  (1928–2001), Italian politician and lawyer